Mount Damavand is a dormant stratovolcano, the highest peak in Iran and Western Asia and the highest volcano in Asia and the 2nd highest volcano in the Eastern Hemisphere (after Mount Kilimanjaro), at an elevation of . Damāvand has a special place in Persian mythology and folklore. It is in the middle of the Alborz range, adjacent to Varārū, Sesang, Gol-e Zard, and Mīānrūd.

Mount Damāvand is the 12th most prominent peak in the world and the second most prominent in Asia after Mount Everest. It is part of the Volcanic Seven Summits mountaineering challenge.

Symbolism and mythology
Damavand is a significant mountain in Persian mythology. It is the symbol of Iranian resistance against despotism and foreign rule in Persian poetry and literature. In Zoroastrian texts and mythology, the three-headed dragon Aži Dahāka was chained within Mount Damāvand, there to remain until the end of the world. In a later version of the same legend, the tyrant Zahhāk was also chained in a cave somewhere in Mount Damāvand after being defeated by Kāveh and Fereydūn. Persian poet Ferdowsi depicts this event in his masterpiece, the Shahnameh:

biyāvarad Zahhāk rā čon navandbe kuh-e Damāvand kardaš be-band

He brought Zahhak like a horse to mount Damavand,And tied him at the peak tight and bound.

The mountain is said to hold magical powers in the Shahnameh. Damāvand has also been named in the Iranian legend of Arash (as recounted by Bal'ami) as the location from which the hero shot his magical arrow to mark the border of Iran, during the border dispute between Iran and Turan. The poem Damāvand by Mohammad Taqī Bahār is also one fine example of the mountain's significance in Persian literature. The first verse of this poem reads:

ey div-e sepid-e pāy dar band,Ey gonbad-e giti, ey Damāvand
O white giant with feet in chains,O dome of the world, O Damāvand.

Mount Damavand is depicted on the reverse of the Iranian 10,000 rial banknote.

The origins and meaning of the word "Damavand" is unclear, yet some prominent researchers have speculated that it probably means "The mountain from which smoke and ash arises", alluding to the volcanic nature of the mountain.

Geology

Setting and structure
Mount Damavand rises within the Alborz range in northern Iran, separating the Iranian plateau to the south from the Caspian Sea in the north. This range rises as a result of the collision between the Arabian and Eurasian tectonic plates. This sort of collision is similar to the collision between the Indian and Eurasion plates to the east, which is causing the Himalaya to rise and does not usually create volcanic activity. Despite this, recent research suggests that a hot region created by the collision is what caused the volcano to rise.

This is separated into two areas - an inner region of hot, likely molten, magma between  depth that is surrounded by an area of dense cooled magma. The top of the chamber is believed to lie to the south of the summit, trending somewhat to the west with depth.

Most volcanic activity originates from the summit area. A few flank vents have been noted, but these are lagely on the upper slopes to the southwest and northeast of the summit.

Eruptive activity
Volcanic activity in the Mount Damavand region first occurred in the Pleistocene almost 1.78 million years ago, but the current edifice began to be built around 600,000 years ago.

Its last eruption was around 5300 BCE in the Holocene. Its steep cone is formed of ash and lava flows mainly of trachyte, andesite, and basalt. Most eruptive activity appears to be lava flows, though some small pyroclastic flow deposits have been noted in drainages radiating from the mountain. One major explosive event is known to have erupted about 280,000 years ago.

Quaternary lavas are directly on the Jurassic sediments. The volcano is crowned by a small crater with sulfuric deposits. Despite the lack of historical eruptions, ongoing thermal activity at Mount Damavand suggests the volcano is not extinct.

Thermal springs

Mineral hot springs are mainly located on the volcano's flanks and at the base, giving evidence of volcanic heat comparatively near the surface of the earth. Hot springs at the base and on the flanks and fumaroles near the summit indicate a hot or cooling magma body still present beneath the volcano. The area around the volcano is the most termally active area in Iran and the springs are being monitored to see if fluctuations in water volume and mineral content are useful in crude prediction of large regional earthquakes.

The most important of these hot springs is Larijan Hot Spring in a village by the name Larijan in the district of Larijan in Lar Valley. The water from this spring is believed to be useful in the treatment of chronic wounds and skin diseases and is bottled for distribution throughout Iran. Near these springs there are public baths with small pools for public use.

Glaciers
A few glaciers are present on the upper slopes of Damavand, the largest of which being Yakhar Glacier. The glaciers on Damavand as well as a few other isolated locations are the source of the few permanently flowing rivers in Iran.

Routes to the summit 

A major settlement for mountain climbers is the new Iranian Mountain Federation Camp in the village of Polour, located on the south of the mountain.

There are at least 16 known routes to the summit, with varying levels of difficulty. Some of them are dangerous and require ice climbing. The Northeastern route is the longest and requires two days to reach the summit starting from the downhill village of Nāndal and a night stay at Takht-e Fereydoun (elevation , a two-story shelter. The western route is noted for its sunset view.

Geographical location

Wildlife

Fish 
Damavand rivers and slopes are famous for brown trout (Salmo trutta).

Mammals
Armenian mouflon (Ovis orientalis) and wild goat (Capra aegagrus) live in the region of Damavand Mts. Persian leopard (Panthera pardus saxicolor) and Syrian brown bear (Ursus arctos syriacus) also inhabit in this region. Smaller mammals include the snow vole (Chionomys nivalis), mouse-like hamster (Calomyscus bailwardi) and Afghan pika (Ochoton rufescens).

Birds
The attractive and unreachable Caspian snowcock (Tetraogallus caspius) lives at high altitudes. Golden eagle (Aquila chrysaetos) breeds in this area. Griffon vultures (Gyps fulvus) are common. Chukar partridge (Alectoris chukar) has a high population and nests between stone and shrubs. Red-fronted serin (Serinus pusillus), linnet (Carduelis cannabina), snow finch (Montifringilla nivalis), rock sparrow (Petronia petronia), rock bunting (Emberiza cia) and horned lark (Eremophila alpestris) are native; in winter they come to the lower hillsides. In spring northern wheatear (Oenanthe oenanthe), rock thrush (Monticola saxatilis), and nightingale (Luscinia megarhynchos) come from Africa for breeding. Grey-necked bunting (Emberiza buchanani), black-headed bunting (Emberiza melanocephala) and common rosefinch (Carpodacus erythrinus) come from India.

Reptiles and amphibians
Marsh frogs (Rana ridibunda) live in Lar riversides. Meadow viper (Vipera ursinii), blunt-nosed viper (Macrovipera lebetina), Iranian valley viper (Vipera latifii) and Caucasian agama (Laudakia caucasia) are among the reptiles of this mountainous region.

Flora

On the southern slope of Damavand, there are remnants of wild pistachia trees (Pistacia atlantica). Along its riversides different kinds of Salix trees like willow (Salix acomphylla) and oleaster (Elaeagnus angustifolia) are found. Greek juniper (Juniperus excelsa) is common in the higher altitudes. On northern slopes, because of higher humidity, there are wild oak, beech, hornbean and hazel trees like: Persian oak (Quercus macranthera), Oriental beech (Fagus orientalis), Eastern hornbeam (Carpinus orientalis), and Turkish hazel (Corylus colurna). There are also many wild flowers such as mountain tulip (Tulipa montana) and Persian stone cress (Aethionema grandiflorum). At higher altitudes, shrubs tend to be sphere and cushion like, examples are : Astragalus species (Astragalus microcephalus), mountain sainfoin (Onobrychis cornuta) and prickly (Acantholimon erinaceum). Different kinds of grasses complete this alpine scene.
Iris barnumiae demawendica (formerly Iris demawendica), is found and named after the mountain.

From mid-May to mid-June the foothills of Damavand are covered in red poppies. This unique type of poppy, growing in areas between 2,000 and 3,500 metres, is referred to in botany books as the Lar poppy or Rineh poppy (Rineh and Lar are villages in the foothills of Damavand).

National Heritage Site 
An anthropologist of Mazandaran Cultural Heritage and Tourism Department, Touba Osanlou, has said that a proposal has been made by a group of Iranian mountaineers to register the highest peak in the Middle East, Mount Damavand as a national heritage site.
Mazandaran Cultural Heritage and Tourism Department has accepted the proposal, the Persian daily Jam-e Jam reported. Osanlou noted that the Iranian Cultural Heritage and Tourism Organization is presently in the process of renaming an upcoming ancient festivity after Mount Damavand. "We have proposed Tirgan Festivity, Tabari Nowruz, to be named as Damavand National Day," she added. Tirgan Festivity is held in Amol County's Rineh region in Mazandaran province.

Gallery

See also
 Tirgan
 List of mountains in Iran
 List of peaks by prominence
 List of Ultras of West Asia
 List of volcanoes in Iran
 Lists of volcanoes
 Maranak
 Volcanic Seven Summits

Explanatory notes

References

External links

 U.S. Geological Survey
 CIA: The World Factbook
 BERNARD HOURCADE, AḤMAD TAFAŻŻOLĪ, "Damāvand", Encyclopædia Iranica

Amol County
Articles containing video clips
Five-thousanders of the Alborz
Highest points of countries
Holocene Asia
Holocene stratovolcanoes
Mountaineering in Iran
Mountains of Iran
Mountains of Mazandaran Province
National symbols of Iran
Places in Shahnameh
Pleistocene Asia
Pleistocene stratovolcanoes
Damavand, Mount
Stratovolcanoes of Iran
Tourist attractions in Amol
Tourist attractions in Mazandaran Province
Volcanic Seven Summits